This is a list of equipment of the Finnish Navy. For equipment of the Finnish Army, see here.

Watercraft

Naval munitions

Coastal Artillery

Land vehicles of the Coastal Forces

Coastal Forces infantry weapon systems

See also 

 List of active Finnish Navy ships
 List of decommissioned ships of the Finnish Navy
 List of equipment of the Finnish Army
 List of former equipment of the Finnish Army

References

Military equipment of Finland
Finnish Navy